Dataran Pahlawan Melaka Megamall (Malacca Warrior Square) is a shopping mall located in Malacca City, Malacca, Malaysia. It was developed and is owned by Hatten Group Sdn Bhd on a 7.7 hectares site in the city, and is the biggest lifestyle shopping megamall in the state. The land the mall now stands was once a seaside green space named Padang Pahlawan (Heroes Field), where the date of the independence of Malaya was announced.

See also
 List of shopping malls in Malaysia
 Mahkota Parade

References

External links

 

2006 establishments in Malaysia
Shopping malls established in 2006
Buildings and structures in Malacca City
Shopping malls in Malacca